Konstantin Korshunov (born 8 July 1998) is a Russian luger. He won the gold medal in the team relay event at the 2021 FIL European Luge Championships held in Sigulda, Latvia.

In 2016, he won the bronze medal in the doubles event at the Winter Youth Olympics held in Lillehammer, Norway. He also won the silver medal in the team relay event.

References

External links 
 
 

Living people
1998 births
Place of birth missing (living people)
Russian male lugers
Lugers at the 2016 Winter Youth Olympics